Zaccheus Dunn House is located in Woodstown, Salem County, New Jersey, United States. The house was built in 1743 and was added to the National Register of Historic Places on August 10, 1977.

See also
National Register of Historic Places listings in Salem County, New Jersey

References

Houses on the National Register of Historic Places in New Jersey
Houses completed in 1743
Houses in Salem County, New Jersey
National Register of Historic Places in Salem County, New Jersey
New Jersey Register of Historic Places
1743 establishments in the Thirteen Colonies
Woodstown, New Jersey